Veta la Palma Estate is a commercial fish farm in southern Spain. The aquaculture operation is part of the private business Pesquerías Isla Mayor, S.A. (PIMSA) at Isla Mayor, municipality of Puebla del Rio near Sevilla. PIMSA is part of Hisparroz, the leading Spanish company in rice seed production, is owned by the family Hernandez, whose industrial and commercial strategy is integrated within the group Ebro Foods. It is located on an island in the Guadalquivir river, 10 miles (16 km) inland from the Atlantic Ocean in Seville province of Spain. At 11,000 hectares it is the largest finca in the environs of Doñana National Park, and one of the biggest private properties in the province of Seville. It produces 1,200 tons of sea bass, bream, grey mullet, and shrimp each year. The fish food used in the farm's semi-extensive systems (fish in the extensive balsas are left to feed on naturally occurring organisms) contains no dioxins, antibiotics or GMOs. Given its 32 km2 area this gives a yearly yield of 37 tons per square kilometer. The fisheries have attracted more than 200 species of migratory bird, many of which are endangered.

History
Isla Mayor, as the nerve centre of the marshlands (Las Marismas) of the Bajo Guadalquivir, has seen a long process of transformation over time due to both the natural evolution caused by silting and the effects of human activity. The village and municipality were known as Villafranco del Guadalquivir, in honour of the caudillo General Franco, in 2000 the name was changed to Isla Mayor by popular vote. The first attempts to exploit the resources of the Isla Mayor date back to the 19th century, but it was not till the third decade of the twentieth century that farming really began in the area, thanks to a project carried between 1926 and 1928 by the British company Islas del Rio Guadalquivir Limited. During the Franco years the Veta la Palma Estate was owned by Argentinians who raised beef cattle. In 1982, the Empresa Agropecuaria del Guadalquivir, owner of the estate since 1966, was acquired by the Hisparroz, S.A. group, which transformed it into PIMSA. The Argentinians feared expropriation after Transition and sold up to the Hernandez family, the owners of the rice company Hisparroz and one of the wealthiest families in Spain. Though it may have seemed a good idea to plant rice, agricultural activities were soon prohibited in much of the finca under Spain's new environmental legislation. Another plan was needed. After a brief introductory period, in 1990 PIMSA was authorised by General Directorate for Fisheries of the Andalusian Regional Government, following the Rector Plan for the Use and Management of the Doñana National Park (PRUG), to introduce fish farming to the area. Initially using 1,500 acres of the estate, the project was gradually extended to reach 8,000 acres. These are flooded with high quality waters which provide a habitat to the significant population of fish and crustaceans which reared on the farm. A further 8,000 acres are currently dedicated to the dry crops and 1,000 acres to the cultivation of rice. The remaining 12,000 acres are maintained to preserve the original biotope of the marshlands.

Ecology
Under the new environmental legislation this fish farm had to support a set of services for hydrology and ecology of the marshlands. The extensive and semi-extensive aquaculture has attracted a range of nesting and migratory species of birds. The total bird population of Veta la Palma can reach a figure of 600,000 covering some 250 different species, of which some 50 suffer some degree of threat in other areas. As such the artificial wetland habitat re-created on the estate plays an essential part in the conservation of birds by guaranteeing food both for species which complete their development cycle from birth on the island before migrating and those which, during the course of migration between Africa and Europe stay on the area temporarily to find food.

References

External links
 Veta La Palma web site
 http://www.empresia.es/empresa/pesquerias-isla-mayor/
 

Fish farming companies
Province of Seville
Companies of Spain